Rex Is Not Your Lawyer was a proposed legal drama from actor Andrew Leeds and novelist David Lampson. A pilot was shot in December 2009, starring David Tennant, Jerry O'Connell, Abigail Spencer, Jane Curtin and Jeffrey Tambor, but was not picked up, and the project was shelved.

Plot
Rex is Not Your Lawyer (2010) starred David Tennant as Rex Alexander, a top litigator who becomes so crippled by panic attacks that he can no longer appear in the courtroom and starts coaching his clients to represent themselves. The pilot episode, titled "Mabel Howard's Wrongful Termination," focused on a case involving private school bus driver Mabel Howard (Cleo King).

Cast
 David Tennant as Rex Alexander, an attorney who suffers an anxiety disorder
 Jeffrey Tambor as Alexander's psychiatrist who also suffers from anxiety disorders
 Abigail Spencer as Lindsey Steers, an ambitious attorney and Alexander's fiancee
 Jane Curtin as Alexander's mother and a successful law professor
 Jerry O'Connell as a good-natured attorney who is secretly in love with Steers
 Lindsay Kraft as Alexander's legal assistant
 Cleo King as Alexander's client in a wrongful termination case

Production
Rex Is Not Your Lawyer, from Universal Media Studios and BermanBraun, was first sold to NBC in Spring 2007 (on a "first-look" agreement through BermanBraun) but the production was stalled because of the Writer's Strike. The program was re-considered and then rejected for the 2008 season as well.  With new programming executives in charge at NBC, and Barry Schindel from Law & Order on board as showrunner, the show was recommissioned in October 2009.

On November 3, 2009, Scottish actor David Tennant, who had recently concluded a run as the lead actor on Doctor Who, was announced as the lead actor in the role of Rex Alexander. Heroes actor Sendhil Ramamurthy was cast as Bruce Sweet, Rex's best friend—an ambitious but good-natured lawyer who was in Rex's shadow until Rex's career switch; Bruce's friendship with Rex becomes complicated when he falls in love with his pal's ex-fiancée, Lindsey Steers (Abigail Spencer). Other cast members in the pilot included Jane Curtin as Rex's mother Ellen, Jeffrey Tambor as Doctor Barry Fineman (originally "Doctor Barry Cohen" in earlier drafts of the script), Lindsey Kraft as Sophia Kraft (Rex's assistant), and Cleo King as Mabel Howard.  The pilot was directed by David Semel.

The original setting for the comedy-drama script was Chicago, Illinois, but it was changed to Los Angeles, California prior to filming. Production began in late November or early December 2009, and scenes for the pilot were shot in and around Los Angeles, utilizing various streets and businesses in the downtown area including the Hilton Checkers (Hilton Hotels & Resorts) and Los Angeles Center Studios. On December 5, actor Jerry O'Connell was spotted on location and the next day it was announced that O'Connell had replaced Ramamurthy as Bruce.  Golf scenes between Tennant and O'Connell were shot in three locations—at the Donald Trump National Golf Course in Palos Verdes, at a driving range in Koreatown, and outdoors on the Los Angeles Center Studio lot—and filming for the pilot was completed a few days before December 25.

During the December 2009 filming, on-set rumors indicated that the show could begin filming its regular series episodes within a matter of weeks, pending network approval.  At the January 2010 Television Critics Association Press Tour, NBC's Angela Bromstad and Jeff Gaspin said that the pilot would be reviewed by executives and that "Rex" could become either a fast-track program airing in Spring 2010 (to help cover NBC's scheduling nightmare regarding the 2010 Tonight Show conflict) or it could be an early Fall 2010 program.  During the early months of 2010, there were at least two test screenings for the pilot in April, one at Universal Parks & Resorts in Orlando, Florida and another at a screening room in Las Vegas, Nevada.

However, it was reported on January 24, 2010, that the sets had been dismantled and stored, and the pilot was later passed over for both the Spring and Fall network schedules. In August 2010, Tennant confirmed during an interview at the 2010 Emmys that the show was "truly and sincerely dead"; later that year he spoke candidly about the pilot in several British interviews.

References

External links

Unaired television pilots
Television pilots not picked up as a series